Chancellor High School is a public high school accredited by the Southern Association of Secondary Schools. It is located in Salem District in the northwestern portion of Spotsylvania County, VA, United States.

History

Chancellor High School opened in the fall of 1988 and is one of five high schools in Spotsylvania County. Currently  Chancellor High School has a student population of approximately 1357.

Named for the Civil War Battle of Chancellorsville, which was fought just west of the school location, Chancellor High School also has the honor of being a Plank Owner of the USS Chancellorsville. The name Chancellor derives from the family of George Chancellor who operated the Chancellorsville Inn, a Union staging point and center of combat during the Battle of Chancellorsville.

Athletics

Still a member of the Battlefield District, Chancellor currently competes within Conference 22 of the VHSL Group 4A North Region.

State Champions and Runner-up Finishes

Chancellor has won nine VHSL state championships, which are:
Girls Field Hockey: 1994, 2001, 2006, 2012, 2013, 2018
Boys Soccer: 1990, 2003
Boys Tennis: 2000

Chancellor has 11 runner up finishes, which are:
Girls Field Hockey: 2002, 2003, 2004, 2005
Girls Gymnastics: 1989, 1991
Boys Soccer: 1993, 2002, 2018
Girls Volleyball: 2000, 2002

Music Department
The music department at Chancellor has been recognized as a Blue Ribbon School, meaning that all top performing ensembles (Symphonic Orchestra, Vocal Ensemble, and Wind Ensemble) received a Superior Rating at Festival.

Notable alumni 

 Yetur Gross-Matos - NFL defensive end for the Carolina Panthers

References

External links
 Chancellor High School Bands website

Public high schools in Virginia
Educational institutions established in 1988
Spotsylvania County Public Schools
1988 establishments in Virginia